United Malays National Organisation of Sabah (Malay: Pertubuhan Kebangsaan Melayu Bersatu Sabah), also abbreviated as Sabah UMNO, is a branch of a political party in Sabah, Malaysia. Sabah UMNO supported and was part of the federal government under Prime Minister Anwar Ibrahim. Sabah UMNO also had one elected representatives holding a deputy ministerial positions respectively in the Anwar Ibrahim cabinet.

History

Establishment of the Sabah UMNO branch
After the 1990 state election when BERJAYA themselves were ousted by United Sabah Party (PBS), USNO Chairman Mustapha Harun returned to team-up with BERJAYA Chairman Harris Salleh in a merger of USNO and BERJAYA for his long-envisaged initiative to create the Sabah chapter of peninsula-based United Malays National Organisation (UMNO) with Mustapha himself became its first chief of UMNO Sabah. In 1996, USNO was finally de-registered by the federal Registrar of Societies (RoS). Six of its legislators joined the Sabah UMNO while the rest joined the opposition PBS.

Mass resignations of BN members and Sabah UMNO leadership from the party
On 11 December 2018, BN chairman and Sabah UMNO chairman Hajiji Noor along with Musbah Jamli, Japlin Akin, Ghulam Haidar Khan Bahadar, Mohd Arifin Mohd Arif, Datuk Isnin Aliasnih, Matbali Musah, Masidi Manjun, Nizam Abu Bakar Titingan, Abdul Rahim Bakri, Azizah Mohd Dun, Seri Ronald Kiandee, Zakaria Mohd Edris, Hafez Yamani Musa, John Ambrose, and Abdul Ghani Mohd Yassin led and announced the mass resignations of BN members and the entire leadership of Sabah UMNO from the party and declared to be an independent politician. Hajiji said "Unfortunately, UMNO is now like it used to be. The existing leadership does not have a clear political direction. We are not sure where UMNO is headed. There are conflicting statements about his future, depending on who you talk to in the current leadership,".

After the announcement, media reports suggested that Sabah UMNO had collapsed or been dissolved. However, UMNO President Ahmad Zahid Hamidi denied the suggestion and Sabah UMNO will not be disbanded due to the group's actions. He also stressed that Sabah UMNO would remain to exist and its leadership would be restructured by remaining members. On 12 December 2018 Member of Parliament for Kinabatangan, Bung Moktar Radin, was appointed as the new Sabah UMNO Chairman to replace Hajiji Mohd Noor. For other positions, Sepanggar Division UMNO Chief, Yakub Khan was appointed as UMNO Sabah Deputy Chairman, Kinabatangan Division UMNO Deputy Chief, Jafry Ariffin as UMNO Sabah Secretary and Tenom UMNO Division Chief,Raimi Unggi as State UMNO Information Chief.

Sabah political crisis
On 6 January 2023, state government of Sabah led by Gabungan Rakyat Sabah (GRS) collapsed when its coalition party Barisan Nasional (BN) withdrew its support. The Leader of UMNO Sabah, a component party of BN, Bung Moktar Radin, Kinabatangan Member of Parliemnt and Lamag Assemblyman, cited a lack of confidence in the leadership of Chief Minister of Sabah Hajiji Noor in the withdrawal.

As of 6 February, there are no changes in the status quo regarding the government of Sabah, following the decision of 5 UMNO MLAs (Shahelmey Yahya (Tanjung Keramat), Jasnih Daya (Pantai Dalit), Yusof Yacob (Sindumin), James Ratib (Sugut) and Mohd Arsad Bistari (Tempasuk)) who publicly supported Hajiji despite Bung's decision, and reshuffle of the state cabinet on 11 January as a result.

On 12 February 2023, Barisan Nasional Secretary General, Zambry Abd. Kadir said Barisan Nasional decided to support the Sabah Government led by Hajiji Noor as Sabah Chief Minister.

On 21 February 2023, Yusof Yacob, along with other 8 MLAs support Hajiji. At the same time, Yusof Yacob, James Ratib, Jasnih Daya, Arshad Bistari, Hamid Awang, Mohammad Mohamarin, Ben Chong and Norazlinah joined PGRS.

List of leaders

List of Chairmen

Elected representatives

Dewan Negara (Senate)

Senators

Dewan Rakyat (House of Representatives)

Members of Parliament of the 15th Malaysian Parliament 

Sabah UMNO has 6 members in the House of Representatives.

Dewan Undangan Negeri (State Legislative Assembly) 

Sabah State Legislative Assembly

General election results

State election results

See also 
 List of political parties in Malaysia
 Malaysian General Election
 Politics of Malaysia
 Barisan Nasional
 Pakatan Harapan
 2020–2022 Malaysian political crisis

References

 
 

 
Political parties in Malaysia
Islamic political parties in Malaysia
Malaysian nationalism
Social conservative parties